Vera Lúcia Fraletti Holtz, better known as Vera Holtz (born August 7, 1953) is a Brazilian television, film and stage actress.

Filmography

Television 
 1983 - Parabéns pra Você .... saleswoman
 1989 - Top Model .... Irma Lamer
 1989 - Que Rei Sou Eu? .... Fanny
 1990 - Barriga de Aluguel .... Dos Anjos
 1990 - Desejo .... Angélica
 1991 - Vamp .... Ms. Alice Penn Taylor
 1992 - De Corpo e Alma .... Simone Guedes
 1993 - Fera Ferida .... Querubina Praxedes de Menezes
 1995 - A Próxima Vítima .... Quitéria Quarta-Feira (Quitéria Bezerra)
 1996 - O Fim do Mundo .... Florisbela Mendonça
 1996 - Você Decide, A Troca
 1997 - Por Amor .... Sirléia Pereira
 1999 - Chiquinha Gonzaga .... Dona Ló
 2000 - Uga-Uga .... Santa
 2000 - A Muralha .... Mãe Cândida Olinto
 2001 - Presença de Anita .... Marta
 2002 - Desejos de Mulher .... Bárbara Toledo
 2003 - Mulheres Apaixonadas .... Santana Gurgel
 2004 - Cabocla .... Generosa
 2005 - Belíssima .... Ornela Sabattini
 2005 - Carga Pesada .... Catarina
 2006 - O Profeta .... Ana
 2007 - Paraíso Tropical .... Marion Novaes
 2008 - Dilemas de Irene - Dona Célia
 2008 - Três Irmãs .... Violeta Áquila
 2010 - Passione - Maria Candelária Lobato (Candê)
 2012 - Avenida Brasil - Lucinda
 2013 - Saramandaia - Dona Redonda
 2016 - A Lei do Amor - Maria Magnólia Costa Leitão (Mág)
 2019 - Amor de Mãe - Kátia

Cinema 
 1991 - Assim na Tela como no Céu
 1992 - Meu Nome é João (curtametragem)
 1993 - Capitalismo Selvagem
 1993 - Diário Noturno (curtametragem)
 1994 - Mil e Uma
 1995 - Vicente (curtametragem)
 1995 - O Menino Maluquinho
 1995 - Carlota Joaquina, Princesa do Brazil
 1996 - Nos Tempos do Cinematógrapho (curtametragem)
 2000 - Tônica Dominante
 2003 - Apolônio Brasil, Campeão da Alegria
 2005 - Bendito Fruto
 2006 - Anjos do Sol
 2006 - O Cavaleiro Didi e a Princesa Lili
 2011 - Família Vende Tudo

References

External links 
 

1953 births
Living people
People from Tatuí
Actresses from São Paulo (state)
Brazilian people of German descent
Brazilian people of Italian descent
Brazilian telenovela actresses
Brazilian stage actresses
Brazilian television actresses